The Hop Sing Tong is a Chinese American Tong that was established in 1875.

Branches

The Hop Sing Tong has several branches in the United States including in:
 Boise, Idaho - 706 Front Street (defunct)
 Denver, Colorado - 4130 E Colfax Avenue
 Los Angeles, California - 428 Gin Ling Way
 Marysville, California - 113 C Street 
 Portland, Oregon - 317 NW 4th Avenue
 San Francisco, California - 137 Waverly Place
 San Jose, California - 639 N 6th Street (defunct)
 Seattle, Washington - 512 Maynard Avenue S
 Vallejo, California - 404 Marin Street (defunct)

See also
Raymond Chow Kwok Cheung, Hop Sing Tong enforcer
Leung Ying, Former Hop Sing Tong member turned mass murderer

References

Chinese-American organizations
Tongs (organizations)